Sophia Frederica of Mecklenburg-Schwerin (24 August 1758 – 29 November 1794) was born a Princess and Duchess of Mecklenburg-Schwerin, and by marriage Hereditary Princess of Denmark and Norway.

Life

Born in Schwerin, she was the only daughter of Duke Louis of Mecklenburg-Schwerin, second son of Christian Louis II, Duke of Mecklenburg-Schwerin, and Princess Charlotte Sophie of Saxe-Coburg-Saalfeld. Her only sibling was Frederick, who was about two years older.

Life in Denmark
On 21 October 1774 in Copenhagen, she married Hereditary Prince Frederick of Denmark and Norway, the son of King Frederick V of Denmark and his second wife Juliane Marie of Brunswick-Wolfenbüttel, who was the regent in Denmark between 1772 and 1784. She was sixteen years old when she was married.

Sophia Frederica, known as Sofie Frederikke af Mecklenburg-Schwerin in Denmark, was described as jolly, charming and intelligent.  She had a hard time in the beginning adapting to her new, stiffer environment, but became quite popular.   During the first ten years of her marriage (1774-1784), she gave birth to three daughters, the eldest two were stillborn and the third lived only five months; it was only in 1786 when she had the first of her living children, the future King Christian VIII.

It is said she was disappointed when she met her husband for the first time, but they came to be fond of each other, although they both supposedly took lovers; her husband had a mistress, her companion Caja Hviid, while the father of Sophia Frederica's children was rumored to be her husband's adjutant, Frederik von Blücher. It was said that the harmony of their marriage was based on mutual understanding.   The harmonious friendship between the spouses created a fear that Sophia Frederica's influence over her husband would lead to her interfering in politics.

She died in Sorgenfri Palace.

Issue

Sophia Frederica and Prince Frederick had the following children: 

Stillborn daughter (19 September 1781).
Stillborn daughter (17 February 1783).
Princess Juliana Marie (2 May 1784 - 28 October 1784), died in infancy.
Prince Christian Frederick (18 September 1786 - 20 January 1848), future King Christian Frederick of Norway and Christian VIII of Denmark.
Princess Juliane Sophie (18 February 1788 - 9 May 1850), married in 1812 to Prince William of Hesse-Philippsthal-Barchfeld; they had no issue.
Princess Louise Charlotte (30 October 1789 - 28 March 1864), married in 1810 to Prince William of Hesse-Cassel; they had issue.
Hereditary Prince Ferdinand (22 November 1792 - 29 June 1863), married in 1829 to Princess Caroline of Denmark; they had no issue.

Ancestry

References

Citations

Bibliography

External links

  Article in the Dansk biografisk Lexikon

1758 births
1794 deaths
18th-century Danish nobility
18th-century German people
18th-century Norwegian nobility
18th-century Danish women
Danish princesses
Duchesses of Mecklenburg-Schwerin
German princesses
House of Mecklenburg-Schwerin
House of Oldenburg in Denmark
Norwegian princesses
People from Schwerin
Burials at Roskilde Cathedral